The 1990 Futisliiga was won by Kuusysi Lahti. However during the playoff Helsingin JK won the Finland national championship.

Statistics of Futisliiga in the 1990 season.

Overview
It was contested by 12 teams, and HJK Helsinki won the championship.

Preliminary stage

Table

Results

Championship Playoffs

Quarterfinals

|}

Semifinals

|}

For Third Place

|}
MP Mikkeli were qualified for the first round of the 1991–92 UEFA Cup.

Finals

|}
The champions HJK Helsinki were qualified for the first round of the 1991–92 European Cup, while the Kuusysi Lahti were qualified for the first round of the 1991–92 UEFA Cup.

See also
Ykkönen (Tier 2)

References

External Links 

 Finland - List of final tables (RSSSF)

Veikkausliiga seasons
Fin
Fin
1